Chance is a census-designated place (CDP) in Somerset County, Maryland, United States. The population was 377 at the 2000 census. It is included in the Salisbury, Maryland-Delaware Metropolitan Statistical Area.

History
The community took its name from the estate of the same name of an early settler.

The Ida May and Rock Creek Methodist Episcopal Church are listed on the National Register of Historic Places.

Geography
Chance is located at  (38.176818, −75.939272).

Demographics

As of the census of 2000, there were 377 people, 161 households, and 113 families residing in the CDP. The racial makeup of the CDP was 75.60% White, 23.61% African American, 0.27% from other races, and 0.53% from two or more races. Hispanic or Latino of any race were 0.53% of the population.

There were 161 households, out of which 17.4% had children under the age of 18 living with them, 54.0% were married couples living together, 12.4% had a female householder with no husband present, and 29.2% were non-families. 23.6% of all households were made up of individuals, and 10.6% had someone living alone who was 65 years of age or older. The average household size was 2.34 and the average family size was 2.74.

In the CDP, the population was spread out, with 18.8% under the age of 18, 5.0% from 18 to 24, 24.1% from 25 to 44, 29.7% from 45 to 64, and 22.3% who were 65 years of age or older. The median age was 47 years. For every 100 females, there were 93.3 males. For every 100 females age 18 and over, there were 96.2 males.

The median income for a household in the CDP was $34,531, and the median income for a family was $37,969. Males had a median income of $25,469 versus $21,875 for females. The per capita income for the CDP was $15,706. About 16.8% of families and 23.2% of the population were below the poverty line, including 51.9% of those under age 18 and 14.3% of those age 65 or over.

Notable person
Dale Midkiff  (born 1959), actor, best known for Elvis and Me (TV movie) and Pet Sematary (film)

References

Crabbing communities in Maryland
Census-designated places in Somerset County, Maryland
Census-designated places in Maryland
Salisbury metropolitan area
Maryland populated places on the Chesapeake Bay